The NASA Star and Exoplanet Database (NStED) is an on-line astronomical stellar and exoplanet catalog and data service that collates and cross-correlates astronomical data and information on exoplanets and their host stars. NStED is dedicated to collecting and serving important public data sets involved in the search for and characterization of exoplanets and their host stars. The data include stellar parameters (such as positions, magnitudes, and temperatures), exoplanet parameters (such as masses and orbital parameters) and discovery/characterization data (such as published radial velocity curves, photometric light curves, images, and spectra).

The NStED collects and serves public data to support the search for and characterization of extra-solar planets (exoplanets) and their host stars. The data include published light curves, images, spectra and parameters, and time-series data from surveys that aim to discover transiting exoplanets. All data are validated by the NStED science staff and traced to their sources. NStED is the U.S. data portal for the CoRoT mission.

As of December 2011, SDtED is no longer in operation. Most data and services have been transferred to the NASA Exoplanet Archive.

Search characteristics
Data are searchable either for an individual star or by stellar and planetary properties.

NStED offers direct access to frequently accessed tables:
List of all known planets
List of all known planet-hosting stars

Survey programs
NStED also serves photometric time-series data from surveys that aim to discover transiting exoplanets such as Kepler and the CoRoT.
NStED provides access to over 500,000 light curves from space and ground-based exoplanet transit survey programs, including:

 Kepler
 CoRoT
 HATNet Project
 Trans-Atlantic Exoplanet Survey
 KELT

The transit survey data are linked to an online periodogram service that can be used to search for periods in the transit survey data sets.  A user can also upload their own time series data to search for periods in their own data.

The planetary orbital parameters are linked to an online  transit ephemeris prediction tool which can be used to predict the probability that an exoplanet may transit and the date/time and observability of the transits.

See also
Extrasolar Planets Encyclopaedia
Exoplanet Data Explorer

External links
 NASA Exoplanet Science Institute
 Planet Hunters
 Infrared Processing and Analysis Center

Astronomical databases
Astronomy websites
Exoplanet catalogues
Stellar astronomy
Computational astronomy
Databases in the United States